Połomia may refer to the following places:
Połomia, Tarnowskie Góry County in Silesian Voivodeship (south Poland)
Połomia, Dębica County in Subcarpathian Voivodeship (south-east Poland)
Połomia, Strzyżów County in Subcarpathian Voivodeship (south-east Poland)
Połomia, Wodzisław County in Silesian Voivodeship (south Poland)